Kobee (Korean: 코비, Japanese: コビー) is a South Korean jet hydrofoil ferry line that operates services between Busan, South Korea and Fukuoka, Japan. Miraejet operates the ferry line.

See also
 Beetle - A ferry line between Fukuoka and Busan operated by a division of JR Kyushu

External links
 KOBEE

Ferry companies of South Korea
Shipping companies of South Korea